The World Masters Squash Championships are an international squash competition organised by the World Squash Federation and played between players for athletes over the age of 35 years. World Masters are divided into ten categories — Over 35, Over 40, Over 45, Over 50, Over 55, Over 60, Over 65, Over 70, Over 75 and Over 80.

Past results

Men's championship

Men's champions by country

Women's championship

Women's champions by country

See also
 World Squash Federation
 World Masters Games
 World Open

References

External links
World Master Championships history

Squash tournaments
Squash records and statistics